Acanthus ilicifolius, commonly known as holly-leaved acanthus, sea holly, and holy mangrove is a species of shrubs or herbs, of the plant family Acanthaceae, native to Australia, Australasia, and Southeast Asia. It is used as medicine in asthma and rheumatism.

Description

It has shallow tap roots and occasionally develops a stilt root. Fruits are kidney-shaped.

Distribution and habitat
The species is widespread Southeast Asia, Indochina, Indonesia, the Philippines and northern Australia. It occurs in mangrove habitats.

References

Further reading

External links

ilicifolius
Plants described in 1753
Taxa named by Carl Linnaeus